Mascarin Peak (until 2003 called State President Swart Peak), is the highest mountain on Marion Island, with a height of . Marion Island is the largest island of the Prince Edward Islands in the sub-Antarctic Indian Ocean. The islands belong to South Africa and are administered by the South African National Antarctic Programme.

Mascarin Peak is South Africa's only active volcano. The last eruption occurred in 2004. Renamed in 2003 after Marion du Fresne's frigate Le Mascarin.

References

Mountains of South Africa
Prince Edward Islands